Washington Township is a township in Brown County, Kansas, United States.  As of the 2000 census, its population was 541.

Geography
According to the USGS, it contains three cemeteries: All Saints, Kimberlin and Miller.

References
 USGS Geographic Names Information System (GNIS)

External links
 US-Counties.com
 City-Data.com

Townships in Brown County, Kansas
Townships in Kansas